Radomir Vukčević (15 September 1941 – 28 November 2014) was a Yugoslav footballer.

International career
He made his debut for Yugoslavia in a November 1967 friendly match away against the Netherlands and earned a total of 9 caps, scoring no goals. His final international was a September 1971 friendly against Mexico.

References

External links
 
 Profile on reprezentacija.rs

1941 births
2014 deaths
Sportspeople from Knin
Croatian people of Serbian descent
Association football goalkeepers
Yugoslav footballers
Yugoslavia international footballers
UEFA Euro 1968 players
HNK Hajduk Split players
AC Ajaccio players
Yugoslav First League players
Ligue 2 players
Yugoslav expatriate footballers
Expatriate footballers in France
Yugoslav expatriate sportspeople in France
Burials at Lovrinac Cemetery